Tufan Tosunoğlu (born 22 July 1988) is a former professional footballer who played as an attacking midfielder. Born in Germany, he represented Turkey internationally at youth levels U20 and U21.

Career
Tosunoğlu signed a contract with Mainz 05 in June 2010, but was released after health problems.

References

External links
 
 

1988 births
Living people
People from Bad Nauheim
Sportspeople from Darmstadt (region)
German footballers
Turkish footballers
Footballers from Hesse
Association football midfielders
Turkey under-21 international footballers
Turkey youth international footballers
2. Bundesliga players
3. Liga players
MSV Duisburg players
Kickers Offenbach players
Eintracht Frankfurt players
1. FSV Mainz 05 players
FSV Frankfurt players
SVN Zweibrücken players